Alebra is a genus of leafhoppers in the subfamily Typhlocybinae. They genetically evolved their exoskeleton to achieve vibrant colors to defend themselves from predators.

Species
These 22 species belong to the genus Alebra:

 Alebra albostriella (Fallén, 1826) c g
 Alebra arisana (Matsumura, 1931) c g
 Alebra aurea (Walsh, 1862) c g b
 Alebra bella Hamilton, 1995 c g
 Alebra bicincta DeLong, 1918 c g b
 Alebra castaneae Hamilton, 1995 c g
 Alebra coryli Le Quesne, 1977 c g
 Alebra costatella Matsumura, 1931 c g
 Alebra eburnea DeLong, 1918 c g b
 Alebra elegans Hamilton, 1995 c g b
 Alebra floridae Hamilton, 1995 c g
 Alebra fumida Gillette, 1898 c g b
 Alebra kuyania (Matsumura, 1932) c g
 Alebra neglecta Wagner, 1940 c g
 Alebra pallida Dworakowska, 1968 c g
 Alebra rubrafrons DeLong, 1918 c g b
 Alebra shaanxiensis (Ma, 1981) c g
 Alebra sorbi Wagner, 1949 c g
 Alebra thoracica Hamilton, 1995 c g b
 Alebra viridis Rey, 1894 c g
 Alebra wahlbergi (Boheman, 1845) c g b
 Alebra xianensis (Ma, 1981) c g

Data sources: i = ITIS, c = Catalogue of Life, g = GBIF, b = Bugguide.net,

References

Cicadellidae genera
Alebrini